R M Groves may refer to:

Robert Groves, Director of the United States Census Bureau
Robert Marsland Groves, Royal Navy and Royal Air Force officer